Clive Stanley Efford (born 10 July 1958) is a British Labour Party politician who has served as Member of Parliament (MP) for Eltham since 1997.

Early life
Efford was born in London and educated at Walworth School and Southwark College. He worked in his family jewellery business, until he completed The Knowledge and qualified as London taxi driver in 1987. In 1986, he became an elected councillor in the London Borough of Greenwich, and continued in both these occupations until being elected to Parliament in 1997.

Political career
Efford was first elected to Greenwich Council in 1986 for the Eltham Well Hall Ward, becoming the Labour Group Chief Whip in 1990. After first contesting the seat of Eltham at the 1992 general election, he successfully won the seat five years later in 1997. He went on to win the seat at the ensuing general elections in 2001, 2005 and 2010, with his majority declining after each until the 2015 general election and increased further in 2017.

He made his maiden speech in the House of Commons on 25 June 1997. Almost as soon as he was elected, he was required to deal with the fallout from the family of murdered Eltham teenager Stephen Lawrence registering a formal complaint with the Police Complaints Authority, with the police officers in question facing allegations of racism.

In Parliament, he has served on a number of Select committees, most notably being a member of the Transport Select Committee from 2001 to 2008. In 2003, he was one of the Labour MPs who rebelled against the government and voted against UK involvement in the Iraq War. In 2005, Efford was responsible for the reformation of the previously defunct Tribune Group, though unlike its previous incarnation, membership was restricted to backbench Labour MPs. In 2008, he became the Parliamentary Private Secretary to Housing Minister Margaret Beckett, later becoming the PPS to John Healey in the same role from 2009 to 2010.
 
He was one of the first MPs to declare his support for Ed Miliband, the successful candidate, in the 2010 Labour leadership election. Miliband subsequently appointed him to the Opposition Front Bench in 2011 as a Shadow Home Office Minister under new Shadow Home Secretary Yvette Cooper. In the reshuffle of October 2011, he became the Shadow Minister for Sport.

Clive Efford was one of 36 Labour MPs to nominate Jeremy Corbyn as a candidate in the Labour leadership election of 2015 and he retained his position in Corbyn's shadow cabinet. He resigned from Corbyn's shadow cabinet following a large number of resignations from the Labour front bench on 28 June 2016. He supported Owen Smith in the failed attempt to replace Jeremy Corbyn in the 2016 Labour Party (UK) leadership election.

Efford was shortlisted for the Grassroot Diplomat Initiative Award in 2015 for his work on National Health Service Bill, and he remains in the directory of the Grassroot Diplomat Who's Who publication.

Efford relaunched the Tribune Group of MPs in April 2017, aiming to reconnect with traditional Labour voters while also appealing to the centre ground.

Efford endorsed Keir Starmer in the 2020 Labour Party leadership election.

References

External links
 Clive Efford MP (official site)
 Labour Party
 
 Guardian Unlimited Politics – Ask Aristotle: Clive Efford MP
 BBC Politics page 

1958 births
Living people
Labour Party (UK) MPs for English constituencies
Councillors in the Royal Borough of Greenwich
UK MPs 1997–2001
UK MPs 2001–2005
UK MPs 2005–2010
UK MPs 2010–2015
UK MPs 2015–2017
UK MPs 2017–2019
UK MPs 2019–present